War & Peace Volume 2 (The Peace Disc) is the sixth studio album by American rapper Ice Cube, released March 21, 2000 on his own label Lench Mob Records with distribution by Priority Records. It is the second part from the two-album project War & Peace; the previous volume, War & Peace Vol. 1 (The War Disc) was released in 1998. This was Ice Cube's final album under Priority Records and his last until the release of Laugh Now, Cry Later in 2006.

The album received generally positive reviews from critics and debuted at number three on the US Billboard 200, selling 185,000 copies in its first week. The album was certified gold by the Recording Industry Association of America (RIAA) in May 2000. The club song "You Can Do It", which then later re-released in 2004, was a UK number two for Ice Cube.

Commercial performance
War & Peace Vol. 2 (The Peace Disc)  debuted at number three on the US Billboard 200, selling 185,000 copies in its first week. This became Ice Cube's fifth US top-ten album.  The album also debuted at number one on the US Top R&B/Hip-Hop Albums chart. On May 31, 2000, the album was certified gold by the Recording Industry Association of America (RIAA) for sales of over 500,000 copies in the United States.

Track listing
Credits adapted from the album's liner notes.

Samples
Until We Rich
"Show Me" by Glenn Jones
Record Company Pimpin
"Riding High" by Faze-O
"Please Listen to My Demo" by EPMD
Hello
"The Watcher" by Dr. Dre
Waitin' Ta Hate
"Public Enemy No. 1" by Public Enemy
"So Wat Cha Sayin'" by EPMD
You Can Do It
"I Dream of Jeannie" by Hugo Montenegro
"Rapper's Delight" by Sugarhill Gang
"The Breaks" by Kurtis Blow
"Planet Rock" by Afrika Bambaataa and Soulsonic Force
"I Wanna Rock" by Luke
Gotta Be Insanity
"Keep It Hot" by Cameo
"The What" by The Notorious B.I.G.
Mackin' & Driving
"Pushin' Weight" by Ice Cube

Charts

Weekly charts

Year-end charts

Certifications

See also
 List of number-one R&B albums of 2000 (U.S.)

References

External links
 War & Peace Vol. 2 (The Peace Disc) at Discogs
 War & Peace Vol. 2 (The Peace Disc) at MusicBrainz
 War & Peace Vol. 2 (The Peace Disc) at Tower Records

2000 albums
Ice Cube albums
Albums produced by Battlecat (producer)
Albums produced by Bud'da
Albums produced by Dr. Dre
Albums produced by Sean Combs
Priority Records albums
Sequel albums